P. J. Cholapuram is a panchayat town in Karur district in the Indian state of Tamil Nadu.

Demographics
 India census, P. J. Cholapuram had a population of 6543. Males constitute 50% of the population and females 50%. P. J. Cholapuram has an average literacy rate of 58%, lower than the national average of 59.5%: male literacy is 70%, and female literacy is 46%. In P. J. Cholapuram, 10% of the population is under 6 years of age.

References

Cities and towns in Karur district